Delphi Primrose (born 13 October 2003) is a British model, TikToker, and socialite. Primrose was featured on the cover of the August issue of Tatler Magazine in 2021.

Early life and family 
The Honourable Delphi Helen Isobel Primrose was born on 13 October 2003 to Caroline Primrose, Lady Dalmeny and Harry Primrose, Lord Dalmeny, the heir to the Earl of Rosebery. Her parents divorced in 2014. A member of the Clan Primrose, she is a granddaughter of Neil Primrose, 7th Earl of Rosebery and a great-great granddaughter of British Prime Minister Archibald Primrose, 5th Earl of Rosebery and Hannah Primrose, Countess of Rosebery. Her paternal great-great-great grandfather, Baron Nathan Mayer Rothschild, was once the wealthiest man in the world. Primrose has four siblings: Caspian, Marina, Ptolemy and Celeste, and is one of a set of triplets. Marina is her favourite. She and her family reside at Dalmeny House, the family seat in Scotland, and at a residence in London.

Career 
Primrose signed with Storm Management in 2018 after being scouted while on holiday. 

She was the cover girl of the August 2021 cover of Tatler and featured in a spread modelling clothes by Yves Saint Laurent and Dior.

As of 2022, she has over 45,000 followers on the social media platform TikTok. She amassed over 7.4 million views on one of her videos.

Primrose has over 19,000 followers on the social media platform Instagram.

Personal life 
She is a member of her school's Caledonian Scottish dancing society.

References

External links 
 TikTok

Living people
2003 births
Daughters of barons
British TikTokers
Delphi
Scottish female models
Scottish Internet celebrities
Scottish people of German-Jewish descent
Scottish socialites
Triplets